Jonas Björkman and Todd Woodbridge were the defending champions but did not compete that year.

David Adams and Robbie Koenig won in the final 7–6(7–5), 3–6, 6–3 against Tomáš Cibulec and Leoš Friedl.

Seeds
Champion seeds are indicated in bold text while text in italics indicates the round in which those seeds were eliminated.

  Donald Johnson /  Jared Palmer (first round)
  David Adams /  Robbie Koenig (champions)
  Petr Pála /  Pavel Vízner (first round)
  Jan-Michael Gambill /  Graydon Oliver (first round)

Draw

External links
 2003 Heineken Open Doubles Draw

2003 Heineken Open
Doubles